Dmitriyevka is a rural locality (a selo) in Beryozovskoye Rural Settlement, Buturlinovsky District, Voronezh Oblast, Russia. The population was 292 as of 2010. There are 4 streets.

Geography 
Dmitriyevka is located 8 km southwest of Buturlinovka (the district's administrative centre) by road. Buturlinovka is the nearest rural locality.

References 

Rural localities in Buturlinovsky District